Wistow is a small town, just outside Mount Barker, on Wellington Road. It is a town formed around the intersection of Wellington Road (Mount Barker to Wellington) and Long Valley Road (Wistow to Strathalbyn)

It was home to a general store (closed) which is now a bakery/cafe with a Post Office agency, a hall and a church.

It has a cricket ground on the top of a hill. The Wistow Cricket Club, known as the Echidnas, has played on the hill since the early 1900s, and is one of the strongest clubs in the Alexandra and Eastern Hills Cricket Association. The Echidnas have won five A Grade premierships since the Association was established in 1982 (1993/1994, 1999/2000, 2002/2003, 2004/2005 and 2007/2008).

The Wistow Community Association is an active community group that once ran the Wistow Country Market every 3rd Saturday (now discontinued), has frequent social events and publishes a regular newsletter. The Wistow Community Hall, owned by the Association, is leased out to a variety of sporting, social and environmental groups.

References 

Towns in South Australia